Beyblade: Metal Fusion, known in Japan as  is a Japanese manga and anime. It is a spin-off of the original Beyblade series, and was created by Tatsunoko Pro, Synergy SP, is co-produced by Nelvana. This Beyblade series features a complete new set of characters, and a new story.

Series overview

Episode list

Beyblade: Metal Fusion (2009–2010)

Beyblade: Metal Masters (2010–11)

Beyblade: Metal Fury (2011–12)

Beyblade: Shogun Steel (2012)

DVD releases

Region 1 (North America)

Region 2 (Japan)

References
General
 List and summary of episodes on TV Tokyo: Metal Fight Beyblade
 Story and characters at D-Rights Official Metal Fight Beyblade
 Metal Fight Beyblade - TV Tokyo
 web Newtype　公式サイト　アニメランド-地上波-

Specific

Metal series
Beyblade: Metal Saga